Mark Daniel Bradshaw (born May 12, 1962 in Happy Camp, California) is a retired diver from the United States. He competed for his native country at the 1988 Summer Olympics, finishing in fifth place in the Men's 3m Springboard event.
 
Bradshaw twice won a silver medal in the same event at the Pan American Games, in 1991 and 1995. He was affiliated with the Ohio State University.

He won two bronze medals at the 1990 Goodwill Games.

Mark Bradshaw is presently the head diving coach at Arizona State University, a position he has held for 16 years.

References

External links
sports-reference
https://web.archive.org/web/20160611023839/http://www.thesundevils.com/ViewArticle.dbml?DB_OEM_ID=30300&ATCLID=207919861

1962 births
Living people
Divers at the 1988 Summer Olympics
Olympic divers of the United States
Sportspeople from California
Ohio State University alumni
American male divers
Pan American Games silver medalists for the United States
People from Happy Camp, California
Pan American Games medalists in diving
Universiade medalists in diving
Divers at the 1995 Pan American Games
Divers at the 1991 Pan American Games
Universiade bronze medalists for the United States
Goodwill Games medalists in diving
Medalists at the 1985 Summer Universiade
Competitors at the 1990 Goodwill Games
Medalists at the 1991 Pan American Games
Medalists at the 1995 Pan American Games